On August 18 2021, Suspected Islamists attacked a civilian convoy, killing 80.

Attack
On August 18 2021, Islamists attacked and civilian convoy as it was being escorted by military personnel and anti-Islamists Volunteer militias. The attackers ambushed the convoy killing 59 civilians, 15 military personnel, and six volunteer militiamen. The Government claims that 80 attackers were also killed.

References

2021 mass shootings in Africa
2021 murders in Burkina Faso
21st-century mass murder in Burkina Faso
August 2021 crimes in Africa
Mass murder in 2021
Attacks in Burkina Faso
Massacres in Burkina Faso
2021 in Burkina Faso
Massacres in 2021
Jihadist insurgency in Burkina Faso